Hypericum beanii is a species of flowering plant in the family Hypericaceae that is found in China. Its flowers are yellow and bloom in summer.

References

beanii
Flora of China